The Holy Cross School is a Roman Catholic secondary school with academy status for girls located in New Malden, in the Royal Borough of Kingston upon Thames, England. The school specialises in science, and converted to academy status on 1 August 2012.

Most Year 11 girls apply to the small sixth form. Together with its federated brother school Richard Challoner, it operates a coeducational sixth form which is also open to applicants from other schools. The school has just under 1000 pupils attending in total.

History
Holy Cross School was founded in 1931 by the Sisters of the Holy Cross Menzingen. The Sisters arrived in England from Switzerland during the early 1900s and set up a convent at Wimbledon (now in the London Borough of Merton). They bought a house along Sandal Road called "Southesk" - over the building's front door was a Latin inscription which read "This is the house that John built" - from Mr John Austine to use as a new school. On 23 September 1931, Sr Christina and two other Sisters opened the Holy Cross Convent School with 5 pupils. The junior department was split into a separate school and moved to new premises in 1971; it is now a private school Holy Cross Preparatory School. Over the years, the school has continuously grown and buildings added, renovated and refurbished. The original house front remains and is the current school's main entrance. The school is no longer directly under the Sisters and now mainly staffed by lay teachers but is under the order's trusteeship.

Academic standards
Following their October 2007 inspection, Ofsted rated the school as Outstanding, the highest possible rating. The sixth form was assessed as Good, which is point two on the four point scale. The report said "This is an outstanding school. ... The high level of achievement and outstanding quality of care of students are a direct result of excellent leadership and management."

School organisation
The average school day consists of 5 lessons, each lasting 1 hour. Each year group is split into five tutor groups. Each tutor group has a form tutor who will stay with their class throughout that year, this changes every year but the pupils within each form stay the same. All pupils wear a school uniform except the sixth form, who have a smart work dress code. However, from Year 10 certain uniform exceptions are allowed.

House system 
All students are allocated a house when they begin at Holy Cross. This provides opportunity for healthy competition through gaining house points for their particular house, house events and assemblies, building relationships across year groups and creating projects and raising money for charity as a house group. A student’s house identity is displayed by a coloured ribbon sewn above The Holy Cross crest on the school blazer.

Each house, with its own individual colour, is named after a Christian value put forward by the stude

Media coverage
The school has received attention for its educational programs, including a project to share music and drama concepts with Ikeda Junior High School in Osaka, Japan, and a link-up with NASA scientists in Cleveland, Ohio. In 1999 the school was the subject of press coverage when National Health Service leaflets were distributed to pupils despite containing information about contraception, contrary to Catholic teaching.

References

External links
 
 Profile on the Good Schools Guide
 Sisters of the Holy Cross Charitable Trust - Charity Commission
 Sisters of the Holy Cross, Menzingen

Secondary schools in the Royal Borough of Kingston upon Thames
Girls' schools in London
Catholic secondary schools in the Archdiocese of Southwark
Academies in the Royal Borough of Kingston upon Thames
New Malden
Educational institutions established in 1931
1931 establishments in England